Hwacheon County (Hwacheon-gun) is a county in Gangwon Province, South Korea. The northern border is, in some places, within nine kilometres of the Korean Demilitarized Zone. Neighboring counties are Cheorwon to the northwest and north, Yanggu to the east, Chuncheon to the south, and the Gyeonggi-do province to the southwest. The county consists largely of mountains and rivers, between which are small farming communities, military bases and military training grounds. The area is renowned for its rivers, lake trout, indigenous otters, and natural scenery.

Demographics
As of 2005, the population of Hwacheon stood at 23,822. 12,471 of these people were male; 11,351 were female. Only 90 of these people (0.38%) were foreign residents - 20 male and 70 female. The average household was home to 2.4 people, and 3,577 of the population (15%) was aged 65 or older. These numbers do not reflect soldiers stationed in the area, which are estimated at approximately 35,000 personnel.

History
Before 1900, Hwacheon was extremely sparsely populated, with only a few small villages alongside major rivers, due to its rugged terrain and harsh winters. Hwacheon Dam was completed in 1944 and the electricity it generated proved to be a boon. However, it was also source of conflict during the Korean War due to its strategic value as both a power plant and potential weapon (by intentionally flooding downstream areas). It ended up well inside allied territory with the establishment of the DMZ to the north in 1953.

Climate
Hwacheon has a monsoon-influenced humid continental climate (Köppen: Dwa) with cold, dry winters and hot, rainy summers.

Culture
As Gangwon Province is South Korea's coldest region, Hwacheon is home to the yearly Hwacheon Sancheoneo ice fishing festival in which thousands of visitors try to catch as many sancheoneo (wild trout) as possible.  This takes place in the Hwacheoncheon (stream) during nearly the entire month of January. The festival organizers claim there are roughly 1,000,000 visitors annually. The Hwacheon Sancheoneo Festival is classified by CNN as one of the 7 wonders of winter.

Other annual events in Hwacheon include the jjokbae (water raft) Festival in late July, the Tomato Festival in mid-August, and the Dragon Festival.

Food
Hwacheon is famous for its samgyeopsal, a pork dish offered at nearly every restaurant in town. Pork is cooked on a grill over hot coals, cut into bite-sized pieces, and wrapped in a lettuce leaf along with garlic, hot peppers, rice, and various other vegetables and sauces, then eaten by hand. Variants of the meal include using marinated beef.

Tourism
Paroho and Hwacheondam

Paroho May 1944 Hwacheondam is an artificial lake created as constructed. In 1944 years of Japanese colonial rule, Japanese had built a Hwacheondam in order to support the defense industry for invasion to the continent.

Peace Dam

Peace Dam is correspondence dam completed on October 19, 2005, under construction Geumgangsandaem by North Korea. Total storage capacity, one hundred million tons 26.3, length 601 m, height 125 m is a large dam. There are the Bimokpark and Mulmunhall on the left the entrance. Mulmunhall promote the importance of water resources and has been operating a restaurant and other facilities.

Symbol Mark 

The image of the flowing water is derived from Hwacheon's  resource, "water," which means high-level welfare through informationization and ideal administrative services. Combining the image of a bird and the shape of water, Hwacheon's Korean initial ㅎ is modeled.

Sister cities
 Seocho-gu, Seoul
 Chatham-Kent, Ontario, Canada

References

External links
Hwacheon County government home page

 
Counties of Gangwon Province, South Korea
Biosphere reserves of South Korea